The 108th United States Congress began on January 3, 2003. There were nine new senators (seven Republicans, two Democrats) and 53 new representatives (32 Republicans, 21 Democrats), as well as one new delegate (a Democrat), at the start of its first session. Additionally, four representatives (three Democrats, one Republican) took office on various dates in order to fill vacancies during the 108th Congress before it ended on January 3, 2005.

Due to redistricting after the 2000 census, 16 representatives were elected from newly established congressional districts.

Senate

House of Representatives

Took office January 3, 2003

Non-voting members

Took office during the 108th Congress

See also 
List of United States senators in the 108th Congress
List of members of the United States House of Representatives in the 108th Congress by seniority

Notes 

108th United States Congress
108